Daniela Anschütz-Thoms (born 20 November 1974) is a German former speed skater. At the 2006 Winter Olympics, she won a gold medal in the women's team pursuit with the German team, and four years later she defended the title in Vancouver. She is married to former speed skater Marian Thoms since December 2005.

Records

Personal records

World records

References

External links
Official website 
Photos of Daniela Anschütz-Thoms – At Lars Hagen's DESG photo web site
SpeedskatingBase.eu PB and link to results Daniela Anschütz-Thoms
 Daniela Anschütz at SpeedSkatingStats.com

1974 births
Living people
Sportspeople from Erfurt
People from Bezirk Erfurt
German female speed skaters
Olympic speed skaters of Germany
Olympic medalists in speed skating
Olympic gold medalists for Germany
Speed skaters at the 2002 Winter Olympics
Speed skaters at the 2006 Winter Olympics
Speed skaters at the 2010 Winter Olympics
Medalists at the 2006 Winter Olympics
Medalists at the 2010 Winter Olympics
World Allround Speed Skating Championships medalists
World Single Distances Speed Skating Championships medalists
20th-century German women